Jacob Mincks (August 26, 1913 – December 17, 1981) was an American politician who served in the Iowa Senate from 1959 to 1967.

References

1913 births
1981 deaths
Democratic Party Iowa state senators